The Nicholls Colonels football team, representing Nicholls State University, has had 16 American football players drafted into the National Football League (NFL). The highest that a Colonel has ever been drafted is the 3rd round/57th overall, which happened in 1987 with the selection of wide receiver Mark Carrier by the Tampa Bay Buccaneers. The most Colonels selected in a single NFL Draft are two. In the 1987 NFL Draft, Carrier was selected by the Buccaneers and quarterback Doug Hudson by the Kansas City Chiefs.

The Washington Redskins have drafted the most Colonels with a total of three. The Chiefs, Buccaneers and Tennessee Titans/Houston Oilers are next, drafting two players each.

Key

Selections

References

Nicholls

Nicholls Colonels NFL Draft